Ales Bachyla (1918–1983) was a Belarusian poet and playwright. His verses were generally "memories of the front, daily work of common people, love towards his country and the duty of a citizen, patriotism and portraying nature."

References

Belarusian male poets
Belarusian dramatists and playwrights
Belarusian male writers
Male dramatists and playwrights
1918 births
1983 deaths
20th-century Belarusian poets
20th-century dramatists and playwrights
20th-century male writers
Maxim Tank Belarusian State Pedagogical University alumni
Soviet poets
Soviet dramatists and playwrights